Birkirkara Football Club is a professional football club based in the town of Birkirkara, on the island of Malta. The club was formed in 1950, following the amalgamation of Birkirkara United and Birkirkara Celtic. Birkirkara currently play in the Maltese Premier League, which it has won on four occasions, most recently in the 2012–13 season.

Birkirkara is one of the founding members of the European Club Association.

Kits

Honours

Major
Maltese Premier League
Winners (4): 1999–2000, 2005–06, 2009–10, 2012–13
Runners-up (8):1952–53, 1996–97, 1997–98, 1998–99, 2002–03, 2003–04, 2004–05, 2013–14
Maltese FA Trophy
Winners (5): 2001–02, 2002–03, 2004–05, 2007–08, 2014–15
Runners-up (5): 1972–73, 1989–90, 1998–99, 1999–2000, 2017–18
Maltese Super Cup
Winners (7): 2002, 2003, 2004, 2005, 2006, 2013, 2014
 Runners-up (6): 1997, 1999, 2000, 2008, 2010, 2015
Euro Challenge/Lowenbrau Cup
Winners (3): 1998, 2003, 2008
MFA Super 5 Lottery Tournament
Winners (4): 1998, 2002, 2004, 2006

Minor
Sons of Malta Cup (for the Second Division)
Winners (3): 1967–68, 1971–72, 1978–79
Runners-up (1): 1976–77
Cassar Cup:
Runners-up (1): 1952–53

Current squad

European record 
All results (home and away) list Birkirkara's goal tally first.

Note 1: match forfeited, result set to 3–0 by UEFA.

Coaches 

 Frankie Tabone (1951–53)
 Paul Chetcuti (1961–62)
 Emanuel Borg (1964–65)
 Salvu Cuschieri (1965–68)
 Frans Bonnici (1968–69)
 Emmle Saliba (1969–70)
 Salvu Cuschieri (1970–73)
 Tony Buhagiar (1973–74)
 Carmel Galea (1974–76)
 Tony Euchar Grech (1976–78)
 Frankie Zammit (1978–79)
 Marcel Scicluna (1979–84)
 Joe Attard (1984–86)
 Freddie Cardona (1986–87)
 Joe Cilia (1986–88)
 Robert Gatt (1988–89)
 Lolly Aquilina (1989–92)
 Todor Raykov (1992–93)
 Freddie Cardona (1993–94)
 Borislav Giorev (1994–95)
 Lawrence Borg (1995–96)
 Alan Sunderland (1996–97)
 Alfred Cardona (1996–97)
 Alfred Cardona &  Robert Gatt (1997–98)
 Vlada Pejović (1998–99)
 Atanas Marinov (1999–00)
 Alfred Cardona (2000 – 1 December 2001)
 Stephen Azzopardi (1 December 2001 – 1 March 2007)
 John Buttigieg (1 July 2008 – 30 June 2009)
 Paul Zammit (1 July 2009 – 30 May 2011)
 Patrick Curmi (22 May 2011 – 28 September 2011)
 Paul Zammit (3 October 2011 – 29 May 2015)
 Giovanni Tedesco (1 June 2015 – 10 December 2015)
 Dražen Besek (31 December 2015 – 30 November 2016)
 Nikola Jaros (6 December 2016 – 1 June 2017)
 Peter Pullicino (1 June 2017 – 6 September 2017)
 Paul Zammit (6 September 2017 – 26 March 2019)
 John Buttigieg (18 April 2019 – 7 September 2019)
 André Paus (10 September 2019 – 20 April 2022)
 Jonathan Holland (20 April 2022 – 18 May 2022)
 Giovanni Tedesco (18 May 2022 – Present)

Futsal 

Current squad 2018/19

References

External links 
Official website

 
Football clubs in Malta
Association football clubs established in 1950
Sport in Birkirkara
1950 establishments in Malta